Belén Mozo (born 25 September 1988) is a Spanish professional golfer who plays on the LPGA Tour and the Ladies European Tour.

As an amateur, Mozo won the British Ladies Amateur Golf Championship in 2006. Later that year she joined the USC Trojans golf team. After four years of collegiate golf, she turned professional, qualifying to join the LPGA Tour as a rookie in the 2011 season.

Amateur wins
2004 AJGA Thunderbird Invitational, Doral-Publix Junior Classic 
2006 International European Ladies Amateur Championship, British Ladies Amateur Golf Championship, Girls Amateur Championship
Source:

Results in LPGA majors
Results not in chronological order before 2015.

^ The Evian Championship was added as a major in 2013

CUT = missed the half-way cut
WD = withdrew
"T" = tied

Summary

Most consecutive cuts made – 3 (2013 Evian – 2014 British)
Longest streak of top-10s – 0

Team appearances
Amateur
Junior Ryder Cup (representing Europe): 2004 (winners)
Junior Solheim Cup (representing Europe): 2003 (winners), 2005
European Ladies' Team Championship (representing Spain): 2005 (winners), 2007 (winners), 2008

Espirito Santo Trophy (representing Spain): 2006, 2008

Professional
International Crown (representing Spain): 2014 (winners)

References

External links

Spanish female golfers
USC Trojans women's golfers
LPGA Tour golfers
Ladies European Tour golfers
Winners of ladies' major amateur golf championships
Sportspeople from Cádiz
People from Palm Beach Gardens, Florida
1988 births
Living people
20th-century Spanish women
21st-century Spanish women